Oh God, What Now? formally known as Remainiacs, is a British hour-long weekly political podcast about Brexit, speaking from the pro-Remain point of view. It was started on 26 May 2017 as Remainiacs after the European Union membership referendum as "a no-holds-barred podcast for everyone who won't shut up about Brexit". In October 2020, Remainiacs was renamed "Oh God, What Now?", due to the nature of Brexit making the unlikelihood of re-joining and changing nature of the British government.

Description
It was presented by The Guardian Dorian Lynskey, newspaper columnist for i newspaper Ian Dunt, Best for Britain's Naomi Smith, former academic for London School of Economics Ros Taylor, and journalist and former editor Andrew Harrison, who was also the producer. Three former guests; actor and former deputy editor of the New Statesman's Alex Andreou, political commentator Nina Schick and Minnie Rahman, Interim Chief Executive of the Joint Council for the Welfare of Immigrants have later become regular presenters as well.

It followed a format of half the show in a rundown of the news about Brexit with discussion along with a weekly guest, and then the other half with a straight interview with the guest in question. The podcast was both named one of the "Best Podcasts of 2017" by The Guardian Miranda Sawyer, and nominated for a podcasting award, the 2018 Broadcasting Press Guild Awards' "Podcast of the Year", however it lost to Ed Miliband's Reasons to Be Cheerful. The show is made at the back room studio of Soho Radio London, in Great Windmill Street, Soho, London.

As well as the weekly show, there is a series of “Remainiacs Live” shows at which the hosts spoke among themselves about Brexit. Venues included The Phoenix gastropub in Cavendish Square, Marylebone, the Stoke Newington Literary Festival, Leeds City Varieties,  the Epstein Theatre in Liverpool,  Hove's The Old Market Theatre  and regularly at the Leicester Square Theatre. Remainiacs was part of the Podcast Live: Politics  day long festival of  different political podcasts on 7 April 2019 at Friends House, Camden.

Notable guests 
Notable guests have included:

The Bunker

After the relative success of Remainiacs, the ending of the withdrawal period and with the extra funding from their Patreon backers,  the producers of the show created an hour-long non-Brexit general politics podcast called The Bunker in January 2020. This show follows the same format as Remainiacs, but without the reference to Brexit. After just one show, it became one of top ten politics podcasts on the UK iTunes chart. Due to the large amount of news that being produced during the COVID-19 pandemic, from 26 March short one to one interviews half-hour shows were made under the title of The Bunker Daily. Success of The Bunker Daily has led to the show being a permanent feature of the podcast. There is also a culture version of the Bunker, that produced on Saturdays called The Culture Bunker.

See also 
 Opposition to Brexit in the United Kingdom

Notes

References

External links
 Remainiacs' homepage
 Link to the Audioboom page, which has all the shows available

Works about Brexit
Audio podcasts
Pro-Europeanism in the United Kingdom